The men's javelin throw at the 2018 Commonwealth Games, as part of the athletics programme, took place in the Carrara Stadium on 13 and 14 April 2018.

Records
Prior to this competition, the existing world and Games records were as follows:

Schedule
The schedule was as follows:

All times are Australian Eastern Standard Time (UTC+10)

Results

Qualifying round
Across two groups, those who threw ≥78.00 m (Q) or at least the 12 best performers (q) advanced to the final.

Final
The medals were determined in the final.

References

Men's javelin throw
2018